Heroin is the fourteenth solo studio album by American rapper Z-Ro. It was released on June 21, 2010, via Rap-A-Lot 4 Life/J. Prince Entertainment/Fontana Distribution. Recording sessions took place at M.A.D. Studios and at King Of The Ghetto Studio in Houston. Production was handled by Mike Dean, Bigg Tyme, Big E, Steve Below and Z-Ro himself. It features guest appearances from Chris Ward, Billy Cook, Chamillionaire, Lil' Flip, Mike D, Trae and Paul Wall. The album peaked at number 142 on the Billboard 200 in the United States.

Track listing

Sample credits
"Driving Me Wild" contains a sample of "Bump N' Grind (Ol' School Mix)" by R. Kelly
"Thug Nigga" contains a sample of "When a Woman's Fed Up" by R. Kelly
"Do Bad on My Own" contains a sample of "Canon in D Major" by Johann Pachelbel 
"Rollin' on Swangaz" contains a sample of "James Bond Theme" by John Barry and Monty Norman

Charts

References

External links

2010 albums
Z-Ro albums
Albums produced by Z-Ro
Albums produced by Mike Dean (record producer)